Vixen is an unincorporated community in Caldwell Parish, Louisiana, United States.

History
An early variant name was "Maud". A post office called Maud was established in 1880, the name was changed to Vixen in 1898, and the post office closed in 1928. The origin of the name "Vixen" is obscure.

References

Unincorporated communities in Caldwell Parish, Louisiana
Unincorporated communities in Louisiana